The South Wales Premier Cricket League, is the top level of competition for recreational club cricket in South Wales. The league was founded in 1999 as the South East Wales League, being renamed following its accreditation as an ECB Premier League in 2001.

The original South Wales Premier Cricket League did not include all of South Wales's leading clubs. Its clubs came from South Glamorgan and the traditional county of Monmouthshire, while clubs from further west played in the South Wales Cricket Association, a league which has been in existence since 1926. That league too sought ECB Premier League status, but the ECB was not willing to accredit two Premier Leagues in South Wales.

In 2010, the South Wales Premier Cricket League was reorganised. The top five clubs in the 2009 season, together with the top five clubs in the South Wales Cricket Association in 2009, formed a new Premier Division. The original league became a feeder to it and was renamed as the Glamorgan and Monmouthshire Cricket League, and in 2016 it was renamed again as the South East Wales Cricket League. The South Wales Cricket Association continued to operate, and became the other feeder to the South Wales Premier Cricket League. Before the 2015 season, the South Wales Premier Cricket League formed a Division Two by taking five further clubs from each of the two feeder leagues.

Winners

Winners from 2010

Winners 1999 to 2009

Performance by season from 2001

South Wales Premier Cricket League from 2010

South Wales Premier Cricket League 2001 to 2009

South Wales Cricket Association 2001 to 2009

See also
 List of English and Welsh cricket league clubs

References

External links
 South Wales Premier Cricket League - SWPCL Play-Cricket site
 Cricket Wales

Welsh domestic cricket competitions
ECB Premier Leagues